Ken Urban is an American playwright, screenwriter, director, and musician based in New York. He is a senior lecturer at the Massachusetts Institute of Technology and leads the Music and Theatre Arts Program's dramatic writing program. Urban is also a resident playwright at New Dramatists and an affiliated writer at the Playwrights' Center.

Education and teaching 
Urban attended Bucknell University, and graduated magna cum laude in English in 1996. Before graduating, Urban studied in London where he wrote his first play while studying contemporary British theatre, citing the work of Sarah Kane, Caryl Churchill, and Martin McDonagh as his inspiration.

Following his time in London, Urban returned to the United States to earn a Master's and Ph.D. in English Literature from Rutgers University in 2006. After receiving his doctorate, Urban taught at Harvard University for 8 years, and has since held teaching positions at Princeton University and Tufts University, focusing on instruction related to playwriting, screenwriting, academic writing, and dramatic literature. In 2016, Urban was the McGee Visiting Professor of Playwriting at Davidson College.

He began teaching at the Massachusetts Institute of Technology in fall 2017, and founded the annual Music and Theatre Arts Playwright's Lab, a play festival featuring student-written plays performed by local professional actors.

Plays
Plays Urban has written include A Guide for the Homesick, The Remains, Sense of an Ending, The Correspondent, A Future Perfect, The Awake, Nibbler, and The Happy Sad. His works have been produced by the Huntington Theatre Company, Studio Theatre, Rattlestick Playwrights Theater, Theatre503 (London), The Amoralists Theater Company, Stage Traffic (London), First Floor Theater (Chicago), 59E59 Theaters, SpeakEasy Stage Company, The Summer Play Festival at The Public, and Studio 42. Urban's plays are published by Dramatists Play Service, and some of his works have been featured in monologue anthologies.

In the 2017–18 season, two of Urban's plays had world premieres. A Guide for the Homesick was directed by Colman Domingo, and ran at the Huntington Theatre Company in Boston, Massachusetts from October 6 to November 4, 2017. Following its premiere, A Guide for the Homesick won the Independent Reviewers of New England's Award for Best New Script, and was additionally produced in London at Trafalgar Studios in the West End in October 2018, directed by Jonathan O'Boyle, and starring Douglas Booth and Clifford Samuel.

The Remains premiered from May 16 to June 24, 2018 at the Studio Theatre in Washington, D.C., and was directed by Artistic Director David Muse. The Washington Post called The Remains "meticulously crafted" and DC Metro Theatre Arts called it "a landmark play". The Remains was nominated for five Helen Hayes Awards, including the Charles MacArthur Award for Outstanding Original New Play or Musical.

In February 2017, Urban's play Nibbler was produced by The Amoralists and Rattlestick Playwrights Theater in New York, receiving strong notices in The New York Times and the Huffington Post.

Urban's active projects include The Immortals, a drama about academia and the cellular afterlife of Henrietta Lacks; Danger and Opportunity, a comedy about a married gay couple who decide to start a family with an ex-girlfriend; and Inappropriate Sexual Relations, a narrative podcast that dramatizes an anonymous book of postmodern erotica found in a bookstore in Ithaca, NY.

In 2019, The Immortals will be workshopped at the Massachusetts Institute of Technology.

Urban's previous works have been developed at Playwrights Horizons and The Civilians’ R&D Group (both New York), Donmar Warehouse in London, England, Huntington Theatre Company, Williamstown Theatre Festival in Williamstown, Massachusetts, and the Theatre @ Boston Court  in Pasadena, California.

Urban is also a resident playwright at New Dramatists, and an affiliated writer at the Playwrights' Center. He was the Founding Artistic Director of The Committee, a New York-based theatre company that produced "catastrophic theatre" including the first workshop production of Sarah Kane's Cleansed.

Urban is represented at United Talent Agency.

TV and film 
In 2017, Urban wrote the screenplay for the feature-film adaptation of his play The Happy Sad, which screened internationally at over 25 film festivals.

Urban's TV pilot The Art of Listening was optioned by ITV Studios and David Oyelowo's production company Yoruba Saxon.

Awards/recognition
Urban won Best New Play/Large Theater for A Guide for the Homesick at the 2017 IRNE Awards ceremony held April 23, 2018 at the Holiday Inn in Brookline, Massachusetts. In that production, actor McKinley Belcher III won for Best Actor in a Play/Large Theater for his dual role as Teddy/Nicholas. Colman Domingo was nominated for Best Director of a Play/Large Theater. The production was nominated for Best Set Design by William Boles, Best Lighting Design by Russell H. Champa, and Best Sound Design by Lindsay Jones. A Guide for the Homesick was also nominated for Outstanding New Script at the 36th Annual Elliot Norton Awards in 2018, as well as Outstanding Production/Large Theater and Outstanding Actor/Large Theater.

In 2009, Urban won the 2008 L. Arnold Weissberger Award, given each year by the Williamstown Theatre Festival, for his play Sense of an Ending. Urban has also previously won the New York Foundation for the Arts Fellowship, the Huntington Theater Playwriting Fellowship, MacDowell Colony Fellowships, the Dramatist Guild Fellowship, and the Virginia Center for the Creative Arts Fellowship. Urban has earned additional artist residencies at Headlands and Djerassi.

Reviews
The Boston Globe called A Guide for the Homesick "an absorbing tale of conscience and connection" and "a probing, multilayered study of guilt", singling out the performance of actor McKinley Belcher III as "one of the most searing performances in recent memory on a local stage". The website TheaterMania.com called A Guide for the Homesick "a theatrical tour de force". WBUR-FM, on its ARTery blog, found A Guide for the Homesick to be "radiant and searing", "sizzling with erotic energy", and "flawless". A new production of A Guide for the Homesick was produced on the West End at Trafalgar Studios in October 2018.

The Washington Post said of The Remains, "Knockout acting… [and] well stocked with humor. The Remains will spark recognition in anyone who has ever had a long-term relationship – or endured a tense family dinner." Washington City Paper called it an "emotionally rich family dramedy". And DC Metro Theater Arts said The Remains is "a landmark play...a riveting comedy that mourns a gay marriage on the rocks. See it with someone you love." The run of The Remains was extended from the original closing date of June 17, 2018 due to critical acclaim and strong ticket sales.

Publishing and writing 
Urban's plays are published by Dramatists Play Service in the United States (which published Nibbler in fall 2017), and by Methuen in the United Kingdom and Europe. Several have been featured in monologue anthologies.

His essays on theater have appeared in Methuen Drama Guide to Contemporary American Playwrights, Methuen Drama Guide to Contemporary British Playwrights, Contemporary Theatre Review, Modern Drama, A Concise Companion to Contemporary British and Irish Drama, Cool Britannia: British Political Drama in the 1990s, and PAJ: A Journal of Performance and Art.

Music 
Urban is a co-founder of the band Occurrence, which also features vocalists Cat Hollyer and Johnny Hager. In December 2017, the band released The Time of Year, for the 2017 holiday season. The Boston Globe and news radio WBZ (AM) covered its release, with the Globe saying "something tells us Urban’s downbeat take on the holidays won't be a hit". Occurrence's 2016 LP release The Past Will Last Forever received strong reviews including from Atwood Magazine and Clicky Clicky Music.

The band released is sixth LP, Everyone Knows the Disaster Is Coming, on June 15, 2018. It was preceded by the singles "All of Your Devils" on May 14, 2018 and "Weeping Disability" on June 1, 2018. The Southern Sounding blog said of the LP, "the album clings to the throbbing electronic tendencies of past releases while also carving out a unique and refreshingly integrated musical headspace." The band performed two record-release concerts at Rockwood Music Hall in New York City June 15, 2018, and Replay Lounge in Lawrence, Kan., on June 20, 2018.

References

External links 
 

1974 births
Living people
Bucknell University alumni
Rutgers University alumni
Harvard University faculty
21st-century American dramatists and playwrights
American theatre directors